Bullock may refer to:

Animals
 Bullock (in British English), a castrated male bovine animal of any age
 Bullock (in North America), a young bull (an uncastrated male bovine animal)
 Bullock (in Australia, India and New Zealand), an ox, an adult male bovine used for draught (usually but not always castrated)

Places

Canada
 Bullock Channel, a water channel in British Columbia, Canada
 Bullock Bluff, the northern point of Cortes Island, British Columbia, Canada
 Mount Bullock, a mountain in British Columbia, Canada

United States
 Bullock County, Alabama
 Bullock Correctional Facility, a medium-security Alabama Department of Corrections prison
 Bullock, a community in the township of Lanark Highlands, Ontario, Canada
 Bullock, New Jersey, an unincorporated community
 Bullock, South Dakota, a ghost town
 Bullock Creek (South Carolina)

Elsewhere
 Bullock Harbour, near Dalkey, Ireland
 Bullock Park, a townland in County Tyrone, Northern Ireland

Other uses
 Bullock (surname)
 Bullock Hotel, Deadwood, South Dakota
 Bullock Texas State History Museum, Austin, Texas
 Bullock's, a defunct department store chain based in Los Angeles, California

See also
 Bullock Report (A Language for Life), a 1975 UK government report
 Bullock Report (Industrial democracy), a 1977 UK government report
 Bulloch
 Bollocks